also known as  was a Japanese samurai lord and senior retainer of the Ōtomo clan throughout the latter Sengoku period. He was the biological father of Tachibana Muneshige.

Biography 
As Shigetane was additionally known by the name of 'Takahashi Shōun' during the earlier years of his life, he began his service beneath the Ōtomo of Bungo Province around this same initial time, with Ōtomo Sōrin as their leader and head. Eventually, Shigetane became the respective controller of the Takahashi clan, in which he was additionally regarded as one  "Great Pillars" of power to the Otomo clan along with Kamachi Akimori. Shigetane being granted Iwaya Castle that bordered Chikuzen Province in contribution to his authority and prestige.

The powerful Shimazu had conquered the Ryūzōji at Okitanawate in 1584, and by 1586 had set their aim upon the destruction of the Ōtomo, with whom they had a long, intense rivalry. This action forced Shigetane, who was unprepared, to strengthen his Castle defenses.

However, the forces of Shimazu Yoshihisa arrived and launch Siege of Iwaya Castle earlier than the Shigetane initially anticipated, and therefore Shigetane was desperately placed in a dilemma: on one hand he had no more than 763 men, and as the opposition respectively wielded around 50,000 soldiers, no form of defense could be utterly possible, considering that such a mass of military might was additionally set on solely besieging Iwaya castle, as opposed to splitting and assaulting from a different direction. 
And as the circumstances would naturally have it, Shigetane was overwhelmed relatively immediately, but the forces in Iwaya somehow managed to survive for over two weeks before initially seeing that the situation was far beyond any length of salvation, forcing Shigetane to commit suicide there and then, who was consequently praised by the Shimazu for his bravery and conviction, despite being in a situation that entirely contradicted any means of victory.

During the siege of Iwaya Castle, a commanding officer of the Shimazu stopped his attack and said, "Why do you serve the unjust Ōtomo clan that makes light of Buddhism and has faith in Christianity? Your bravery has already been proven, please surrender." To which he answered: "Swearing allegiance and loyalty to your lord and his clan when he is powerful, and betraying the clan when it is weak. Many a man do that, but I owe a debt of gratitude to my lord and his clan, and therefore I cannot do such a thing. A samurai who is ungrateful is worse than animals." It was said that all men in the battlefield, including Shimazu's soldiers admired him.

His son Muneshige later was adopted to the Tachibana clan and succeeded Shigetane's daughter-in-law Tachibana Ginchiyo as the head of the clan.

Notes

References
 Takahashi Shigetane - SamuraiWiki. (Samurai Archives) FWSeal & CEWest, 2005
 Siege of Iwaya - SamuraiWiki. (Samurai Archives) FWSeal & CEWest, 2005

Samurai
Daimyo
1548 births
1586 deaths
Japanese warriors killed in battle